HMS Trent was a 28-gun  sixth-rate frigate of the Royal Navy.

Construction
Trent was one of five frigates of the class built of fir rather than oak. Fir was cheaper and more abundant than oak and permitted noticeably faster construction, but at a cost of a reduced lifespan; the four fir-built Coventry-class vessels that did not get captured lasted an average of only nine years before being struck off.

The vessel was named after the River Trent, England's third-longest waterway. In selecting her name the Board of Admiralty continued a tradition dating to 1644 of using geographic features for ship names; overall, ten of the nineteen Coventry-class vessels were named after well-known regions, rivers or towns. With few exceptions the remainder of the class were named after figures from classical antiquity, following a more modern trend initiated in 1748 by John Montagu, 4th Earl of Sandwich in his capacity as First Lord of the Admiralty.

In sailing qualities Trent was broadly comparable with French frigates of equivalent size, but with a shorter and sturdier hull and greater weight in her broadside guns. She was also comparatively broad-beamed with ample space for provisions and the ship's mess, and incorporating a large magazine for powder and round shot. Taken together, these characteristics would enable Trent to remain at sea for long periods without resupply. She was also built with broad and heavy masts, which balanced the weight of her hull, improved stability in rough weather and made her capable of carrying a greater quantity of sail. The disadvantages of this comparatively heavy design were a decline in manoeuvrability and slower speed when sailing in light winds.

Her designated complement was 200, comprising two commissioned officers  a captain and a lieutenant  overseeing 40 warrant and petty officers, 91 naval ratings, 38 Marines and 29 servants and other ranks. Among these other ranks were four positions reserved for widow's men  fictitious crew members whose pay was intended to be reallocated to the families of sailors who died at sea.

Career

Bien Aimé was a merchant frigate of 20 guns and 85 men. She was on her way to Martinique when on 5 January 1761 she encountered Trent about 10 leagues off Cape Tiburon. Trent captured Bien Aimé after a single-ship action that left Bien Aimé with 40 men killed and wounded. Trent had one man killed and five wounded.

Notes

Citations

References

 David Lyon, The Sailing Navy List, Conway Maritime Press, London 1993. .

External links
 

Frigates of the Royal Navy
1757 ships
Ships built in Woolwich